Hemigordiopsidae is a miliolid family included in the Cornuspiracea (Loeblich & Tappan 1988) that has a range extending from the Early Carboniferous (Visean) to the present.

Hemigordiopsids are characterized by tests in which the proloculus, or first chamber, is followed by an undivided tubular second chamber that is streptospirally coiled, (like a ball of string),at least in early stage, later may be planispiral, involute, or evolute.

Two subfamilies are included, the Hemigordiopsinae and Shanitinae. The Hemigrodiposinae, which as the same range as that of the family, includes some seven genera, five of which were removed from the Cyclogyrenae in the Treatise (Loeblich & Tappan 1964), and one from the Nubeculariinae, same. Diagnosis is essentially that from the Hemigordiopsidae. The Shanitinae, known from the Upper Permian, has a test like that of the Hemigordiosinae except that the chamber interior has vertical pillars.

References

 Alfred R. Loeblich Jr and Helen Tappan, 1964. Sarcodina Chiefly "Thecamoebians" and Foraminiferida; Treatise on Invertebrate Paleontology, Part C Protista 2. Geological Society of America and University of Kansas Press. 
 A. R. Loeblich Jr and Helen Tappan,1988. Forminiferal Genera and their Classification.

Tubothalamea
Foraminifera families